The Head of the Chechen Republic or Head of Chechnya (formerly President of the Chechen Republic or President of Chechnya until 5 March 2011) is the highest office within the political system of the Chechen Republic, as Head of State and Head of Government of Chechnya. The office was instituted in 2003 during the course of the Second Chechen War, when the Russian federal government regained control over the region and after a constitutional referendum approved the current Constitution of the Chechen Republic.

Eligibility
According to the article 66 of the Constitution of the Chechen Republic, a citizen of Russia, no younger than thirty years old, may be elected Head. The term is for five years, with no limits on serving multiple terms (prior to the 2007 constitutional referendum the Head was elected for four years, with a two term limit). The Head is not allowed to be at the same time a deputy of the Parliament of the Chechen Republic, or deputy of a representative body of local self-government.

Presidents and Heads of the Chechen Republic

The latest election for the post was held on 19 September 2021.

Timeline

See also
List of leaders of Communist Chechnya

Sources
 World Statesmen.org

 
Politics of Chechnya
Chechen